The Ringers were a Los Angeles–based rock band formed in 2006. They broke up in 2010. Band members were Joe Hursley (vocals, guitar), Joe Robinson (lead guitar), Joe Stiteler (bass), and Patrick Hursley (drums). They released their second full-length album Headlocks and Highkicks in August 2008, with Dave Cobb producing.

Their first album, "Tokyo Massage III", was released on November 10, 2006. Joe Hursley, also appeared as Maurice in the comedy film Accepted. In the film, the band performed the song "Keepin' Your Head Up" from Tokyo Massage. The Ringers were one of the only unsigned bands to appear on the Accepted film soundtrack.

In April 2008, Joe Hursley played  the coiffed, milk powered, faux rock God 'White Gold'. He wields a milk filled 'One Gallon Axe' guitar in the California Milk Processing Board's ad campaign.

The band has also played shows with: New York Dolls, Lily Allen, Valient Thorr, Authority Zero, Supersuckers, Eagles of Death Metal, Semi Precious Weapons, The Architects, Camp Freddy, Bullets and Octane, Nico Vega, and Veruca Salt and many shows with other local LA bands like: Saint Motel, The Binges, Rumspringa, Roses on Her Grave, The Vacation, and Dirty Kings.

Music videos
 "Oh Well Man" directed by Scott Ludden
 "Tell Me All About It" by Christopher Ashe and Toni Gallagher
of RNDM Creations
 "Rough in the Diamond" directed by John McCauley, Jamspeed Arts
 "Old Man Ron" directed by VIMBY filmmaker Eric Katz. Shot by VIMBY Sr. Producer Eric Thompson / Eric Katz.

Discography
 2008 Headlocks and Highkicks
 2007 "Apocalypto" Single" (Ft. Mason)
 2007 Indie 103.1 Check One...Two Compilation
 2007 Viper Room SXSW Compilation
 2006 Tokyo Massage III
 2006 Accepted movie soundtrack

Film and television
 2008 Vimby.com live performance
 2008 Hard Breakers film (not yet released)
 Miami Ink: Season 3, episode "Ruthless and Toothless" (TLC)
 Technology Jones, episode "Joe Hursley" (MOJO)
 Rehearsals.com recorded session
 Cingular Wireless commercial
 2006 "Accepted" (Universal Pictures) [songs: "Keepin' Your Head Up", "Blitzkrieg Bop" (with Justin Long) and "Spotlite"]
 2011 Balls To The Wall
 2011 "Jaguar Moves" Workaholics season 1, Episode  5

Music placement
 Life of Ryan (MTV)
 Next (MTV)
 Parental Control (MTV)
 Rachel Zoe Project (Bravo)
 The Hard Times of RJ Berger (MTV)
 Jersey Shore (MTV)

Press
 2008 New York Post
 Dec 2008 SPIN magazine "Breaking band"
 2008 Laist.com interview

Showcases
 SXSW 2006–2008 (Austin, TX)
 Viper Room six-month residency (LA)
 CMJ 2006 and 2007 (NYC)

References

See also
 Accepted
 The Ringers'Photo Feature in SPIN

Rock music groups from California
Musical groups from Los Angeles
Musical groups disestablished in 2010